Franz Paul Stangl (26 March 1908 – 28 June 1971) was an Austrian-born police officer and commandant of the Nazi extermination camps Sobibor and Treblinka. Stangl, an employee of the T-4 Euthanasia Program and an SS commander in Nazi Germany, became commandant of the camps during the Operation Reinhard phase of the Holocaust. He worked for Volkswagen do Brasil and was arrested in Brazil in 1967, extradited to West Germany and tried for the mass murder of one million people. In 1970, he was found guilty and sentenced to the maximum penalty, life imprisonment. He died of heart failure six months later.

Early life and Nazi affiliations
Stangl was born in 1908 in Altmünster, located in the Salzkammergut region of Austria. He was the son of a night watchman and had such an emotionally distressing relationship with his father that he was deeply frightened by and hated the sight of the elder Stangl's Habsburg Dragoons uniform. Stangl claimed his father died of malnutrition in 1916. To help support his family, Franz learned to play the zither and earned money giving zither lessons. Stangl completed his public schooling in 1923.

In his teens, he secured an apprenticeship as a weaver, qualifying as a master weaver in 1927. Concerned that this trade offered few opportunities for advancement – and having observed the poor health of his co-workers – Stangl sought a new career.  He moved to Innsbruck in 1930 and applied for an appointment in the Austrian federal police. Stangl later suggested that he liked the security and cleanliness that the police uniforms represented to him. He was accepted in early 1931 and trained for two years at the federal police academy in Linz.

Stangl became a member of the Austrian Nazi Party in 1931 when it was an illegal association for an Austrian police officer at that time. After the war, he denied having been a Nazi since 1931 and claimed that he had enrolled as member of the party only to avoid arrest following the Anschluss of Austria into Nazi Germany in May 1938. Records suggest that Stangl contributed to a Nazi aid fund but he disavowed knowing about the intended party purpose of the fund. Stangl had Nazi Party number 6,370,447 and SS number 296,569.

In 1935, Stangl was accepted into the Kriminalpolizei as a detective in the Austrian town of Wels. After Austria's Anschluss, Stangl was assigned to the Schutzpolizei (which was taken over by the Gestapo) in Linz, where he was posted to the Jewish Bureau.  Stangl joined the SS in May 1938. He ultimately reached the rank of SS-Hauptsturmführer (Captain).

T-4 Euthanasia program, 1940 – March 1943
After the onset of World War II, in early 1940, Stangl was instructed to report for work at the Public Service Foundation for Institutional Care (Gemeinnützige Stiftung für Anstaltspflege), a front organization of the T-4 Euthanasia Program. Stangl purposely solicited for a job in the newly created T-4 program in order to escape difficulties with his boss in the Linz Gestapo. He travelled to the RSHA in Berlin, where he was received by Paul Werner, who offered Stangl a job as supervisor in charge of security at a T-4 facility, and in the language commonly used during recruitment, described Action T4 as a "humanitarian" effort that was "essential, legal, and secret". Next Stangl met with Viktor Brack, who offered him a choice of work between Hartheim and Sonnenstein Euthanasia Centres; Stangl picked Hartheim, which was near Linz.

Through a direct order from Reichsführer-SS Heinrich Himmler issued in November 1940, Stangl became the deputy office manager (Police Superintendent) of the T-4 Euthanasia Program at Hartheim Euthanasia Centre, and in late summer 1941 at Bernburg Euthanasia Centre, where people with mental and physical disabilities, as well as political prisoners, were sent to be killed.

At Hartheim, Stangl served under Christian Wirth as an assistant supervisor in charge of security. When Wirth was succeeded by Franz Reichleitner, Stangl stayed on as Reichleitner's deputy. During his brief posting to Bernburg Euthanasia Centre Stangl reorganized the office at that T-4 facility. In March 1942, Stangl was given a choice to either return to the Linz Gestapo or be transferred to Lublin for work in Operation Reinhard. Stangl accepted the posting to Lublin in the General Government, where he would manage Operation Reinhard under Odilo Globočnik.

Extermination camps

Sobibor, April – August 1942
Stangl was appointed by Reichsführer-SS Heinrich Himmler to be the first commandant of Sobibor extermination camp. Stangl was Sobibor's commandant from 28 April until the end of August 1942, at the rank of SS-Obersturmführer. He claimed that Odilo Globočnik initially suggested that Sobibor was merely a supply camp for the army and that the true nature of the camp became known to him only when he himself discovered a gas chamber hidden in the woods. Globočnik told him that if the Jews "were not working hard enough" he was fully permitted to kill them and that Globočnik would send "new ones".

Stangl studied the camp operations and management of Bełżec, which had commenced extermination activity. He then accelerated the completion of Sobibor.  Around that time Stangl also had further dealings with Wirth, who was running extermination camps at Bełżec and Chelmno. Between 16 and 18 May 1942, Sobibor became fully operational. However, Stangl quickly realized that the extermination process was being encumbered by constant turnover among its prisoner labor force. He ended arbitrary culling of "work Jews" and established semi-permanent work teams, each overseen by a kapo. In the three months before Stangl was transferred to Treblinka, Yitzak Arad estimates that approximately 90,000 Jews were killed at Sobibor. 

Stangl avoided interacting with his victims, and he was rarely seen except when he greeted arriving prisoner transports. On these occasions, he stood out because of the all-white linen riding coat he would wear, an affectation which earned him the nickname "White Death". Prisoners who did interact with him regarded him as one of the "moderates" among the camp staff. He was only ever accused of a single act of hands-on violence, and on one occasion, he convened a meeting to address what he regarded as  Kurt Bolender's "bullying" of the Sonderkommando prisoners working in the extermination area. Stangl took an interest in one prisoner, Shlomo Szmajzner, who was forced to make gold jewelry for the SS officers. After the war, Szmajzner recalled Stangl as an arrogant man who stood out for "his obvious pleasure in his work and his situation. None of the others – although they were, in different ways, so much worse than he – showed this to such an extent. He had this perpetual smile on his face." 

Around 100,000 Jews are believed to have been killed there while Stangl was the administrator until the furnaces broke down in October, by which time Stangl had left. Stangl was succeeded as Sobibor commandant by his Hartheim Euthanasia Center colleague, Franz Reichleitner.

Treblinka, September 1942 – August 1943

On 28 August 1942, Odilo Globočnik ordered Stangl to become Kommandant at the newly opened but disorganized death camp, Treblinka, then under the incompetent command of Irmfried Eberl. Globočnik trusted that Stangl could restore order at Treblinka, since Stangl had a reputation as a highly competent administrator and people manager with an excellent grasp of detail.

Stangl assumed command of Treblinka on 1 September 1942. Stangl wanted his camp to look attractive, so he ordered the paths paved and flowers planted along the sides of Seidel Street, near camp headquarters and SS living quarters. Despite being directly responsible for the camp's operations, Stangl said he limited his contact with Jewish prisoners as much as possible. Stangl rarely intervened with unusually cruel acts (other than gassing) perpetrated by his subordinate officers at the camp. He usually wore a white uniform and carried a whip, which caused prisoners to nickname him the "White Death".

He claimed while in prison that his dedication had nothing to do with ideology or hatred of Jews. He said he matter-of-factly viewed the prisoners as material objects rather than people, including their extermination: "That was my profession. I enjoyed it. It fulfilled me. And yes, I was ambitious about that, I won't deny it." Stangl accepted and grew accustomed to the killings, perceiving prisoners not as humans but merely as "cargo" that must be destroyed. Stangl accepted the extermination of the Jews as a fact. At about this time, Stangl began drinking heavily. He is quoted as saying:

In September 1942, Stangl supervised the building of new, larger gas chambers to augment the existing gas chambers. The new gas chambers became operational in early autumn 1942. It is believed that these death chambers were capable of killing 3,000 people in two hours, and 12,000 to 15,000 victims easily every day, with a maximum capacity of 22,000 deaths in 24 hours. According to Jankiel Wiernik: "When the new gas chambers were completed, the Hauptsturmführer [Stangl] came and remarked to the SS men who were with him: 'Finally the Jewish city is ready'".

Erich Bauer later remarked:

Trieste, August 1943–1945 
In August 1943, along with Globočnik, Stangl was transferred to Trieste, where he helped organize the campaign against Yugoslav partisans and local Jews. Due to illness, he returned to Vienna in early 1945, where he served in the "Alpine Fortress" (Alpenfestung).

Post-war escape, 1945–1961
At the end of the war, Stangl fled without concealing his name. He was detained by the United States Army in 1945 and was briefly imprisoned in Linz, Austria, in 1947, pending investigation. He was suspected of complicity in the T-4 euthanasia programme.

On 30 May 1948, he escaped to Italy with his colleague from Sobibor, SS sergeant Gustav Wagner. Austrian Roman Catholic Bishop Alois Hudal, a Nazi sympathizer, forced to resign by the Vatican in 1952, helped Stangl to escape through a "ratline", and he reached Syria using a Red Cross passport.

Stangl was joined by his wife and family, and lived in Syria for three years. In 1951, they moved to Brazil. After years in other jobs, he found work with the help of friends, at the Volkswagen do Brasil plant in São Bernardo do Campo, still using his own name.

Arrest, trial and death
Although Stangl's role in the mass murder of men, women and children was known to the Austrian authorities, a warrant for his arrest was not issued until 1961. Despite being registered under his real name at the Austrian consulate in São Paulo, it took another six years before he was tracked by Nazi hunter Simon Wiesenthal and arrested by Brazilian federal police on 28 February 1967. He never used an assumed name during his escape, and it is not clear why it took so long to apprehend him. After his extradition to West Germany by Brazilian authorities, he was tried for the deaths of around 1,000,000 people. He admitted to these killings but argued: "My conscience is clear. I was simply doing my duty..."

Stangl's attempt to justify his actions as non-criminal in the face of German law was quoted by Arad:

Philosopher John Kekes discussed Stangl and the degree of his responsibility for war crimes in chapter 4 of his book The Roots of Evil. The Schwurgericht Düsseldorf court found Stangl guilty on 22 December 1970 and sentenced him to the maximum penalty, life imprisonment. While in prison, Stangl was interviewed extensively by Gitta Sereny for a study of him, published under the title Into That Darkness.

She wrote, quoting him:

In his prison interview with Sereny, she later wrote: 

Stangl had pronounced the words "my guilt": but more than the words, the finality of it was in the sagging of his body, and on his face. After more than a minute he started again, a half-hearted attempt, in a dull voice. "My guilt," he said, "is that I am still here. That is my guilt." 

He died of heart failure 19 hours after the conclusion of that interview in a Düsseldorf prison on 28 June 1971.

See also
Glossary of Nazi Germany
List of Nazi Party leaders and officials
List of SS personnel

Notes

External links
Franz Paul Stangl, Holocaust Education & Archive Research Team

1908 births
1971 deaths
People from Altmünster
Aktion T4 personnel
Austrian escapees
Austrian Nazis convicted of war crimes
Austrian prisoners of war
Austrian people convicted of murder
Austrian people who died in prison custody
Austrian police officers
Austrian prisoners sentenced to life imprisonment
Escapees from Austrian detention
Gestapo personnel
Nazi concentration camp commandants
Nazis who died in prison custody
Nazis in South America
People convicted of murder by Germany
People extradited from Brazil
People extradited to Germany
Prisoners sentenced to life imprisonment by Germany
Prisoners who died in German detention
Sobibor extermination camp personnel
SS-Hauptsturmführer
Treblinka extermination camp personnel
Holocaust perpetrators in Poland
World War II prisoners of war held by the United States